First-seeded Joan Hartigan defeated Mall Molesworth 6–1, 6–4, in the final to win the women's singles tennis title at the 1934 Australian Championships.

Seeds
The seeded players are listed below. Joan Hartigan is the champion; others show the round in which they were eliminated.

 Joan Hartigan (champion)
 Mall Molesworth (finalist)
 Emily Hood Westacott (quarterfinals)
 Nancy Chitty (first round)
 Nell Hall (quarterfinals)
 Louie Bickerton (semifinals)
 Kathrine Le Mesurier (semifinals)
 Ula Valkenburg (quarterfinals)

Draw

Key
 Q = Qualifier
 WC = Wild card
 LL = Lucky loser
 r = Retired

Finals

Earlier rounds

Section 1

Section 2

External links
 

1934 in women's tennis
1934
1934 in Australian tennis
1934 in Australian women's sport
Women's Singles